Untying the Knot is an American reality television series that premiered June 4, 2014, and airs on Bravo. The series follows the life of Vikki Ziegler, a divorce mediator. Ziegler mediates, advises and divides divorcing couples' assets out of court. Mark and Michael Millea work with Ziegler in appraising items, they are featured regularly in the series.

In November 2014, the show was renewed for a second season. The second season was expanded to an hour-long format. The second season premiered on November 8, 2015.

Cast
 Vikki Ziegler is a practicing matrimonial lawyer and civil litigator based in New York and New Jersey. She has founded her own law firm, Ziegler and Zemsky LLC. She is a practicing attorney of matrimonial law and civil litigation; a television personality known for her commentaries on high-profile cases; an active volunteer for women’s and children’s charities; and the innovator of a unique and realistic approach to “divorce management.” Bringing together her insights as a divorce attorney, her childhood experience of her own parents’ divorce, and years of careful listening to clients and friends, Ziegler’s approach seeks to de-stigmatize divorce by allowing its empowering aspects to triumph.
 Michael Millea and Mark Millea are two brothers who are co-founders and owners Millea Bros. Ltd., a boutique auction and appraisal company, specializing in fine art and antiques from upscale New York metropolitan area estates.

Episodes

Series overview

Season 1 (2014)

Season 2 (2015–16)

References

External links 

 
 
 

2010s American reality television series
2014 American television series debuts
2016 American television series endings
Bravo (American TV network) original programming
English-language television shows